Patrani is a 1956 Hindi black and white historical drama written by R. S. Choudhury and directed by Vijay Bhatt. The film starred Vyjayanthimala and Pradeep Kumar, with Shashikala, Durga Khote, Om Prakash, Jeevan, David Abraham Cheulkar, Leela Mishra, Kanchanamala, Praveen Paul, Ramesh Sinha, Gadadhar Sharma, Maya, Krishnakant, Helen and Sheila Vaz, forming an ensemble cast. The film was produced by Shankerbhai Bhatt. The film's score was composed by Shankar Jaikishan duo with lyrics provided by Shailendra and Hasrat Jaipuri. Editing was done by Shivaji Awdhut and filming was by K. H. Kapadia. The story revolves around the king, Karma Dev and his attitude.

Plot
The story is about King Karma Dev who gives a lot of importance to physical beauty. His mother, the Rajmata requests Mahamantri Munjal to find him a nice wife. Karma Dev often dreams of marrying an unknown beautiful woman he had once seen in the Somnath temple. Meanwhile, Mrinalla is the princess of Karnataka, who also dreams of marrying a king she had once seen in the Somnath temple. When Munjal happens to see the beautiful woman Mrinalla, he shows the King's  portrait to her and she is happy to finally find the man of her dreams. So she runs away from the palace and searches for Karma Dev to marry him. Soon after, Munjal shows Mrinalla's painting to Karma Dev, who agrees to marry her. On the day of the marriage, the King finds out she is dark and refuses to marry her. After several incidents, Karma Dev realizes his mistake and at last he happily accepts Mrinalla as his Patrani.

Cast
 Vyjayanthimala as Princess Mrinalla
 Pradeep Kumar as King Karma Dev
 Shashikala as Namunjala
 Durga Khote as Raj Mata
 Om Prakash as Vichitram
 Jeevan as Uday Mantri
 David Abraham Cheulkar as Munjal Mehta
 Leela Mishra as Munjal's Wife
 Kanchanamala
 Praveen Paul as Karnatak Queen
 Ramesh Sinha as King Jai Keshi
 Gadadhar Sharma as Raj Jyotishi
 Maya as Queen
 Krishnakant as Ghunghru Mahraj
 Sheila Vaz
 Helen in Guest appearance
 Minoo Katrak in Guest appearance

Casting
The role of Namunjala was first offered to actress Shyama, but she refused the role, which later went to actress Shashikala.  From 4a.m. to 8a.m. and then again from 6p.m. to 8p.m., Shashikala practised her dance rehearsal with choreographer Hiralal, in order to match actress Vyjayanthimala step for step in a dance competition that featured in the film.

Soundtrack
The film's soundtrack was composed by Shankar Jaikishan and the lyrics were penned by Shailendra and Hasrat Jaipuri.

References

External links
 
 Patrani profile at Upperstall.com

1956 films
1950s Hindi-language films
Indian historical drama films
Films scored by Shankar–Jaikishan
Films directed by Vijay Bhatt
1950s historical drama films
Indian black-and-white films